Fujiwara no Korenari (藤原 惟成) (953–989) was a Japanese courtier of the Heian era. A son of Fujiwara no Masaki, he served the Emperor Kazan and joined the Emperor in entering the Kazan-in monastery in 986.

References
Papinot, Edmond (1910). Historical and geographical dictionary of Japan. Tokyo: Librarie Sansaisha.

953 births
989 deaths
Fujiwara clan